The Carson City Public Buildings, on Carson St. in Carson City, Nevada is a set of historic buildings dating back to 1920.  There are three contributing buildings.  The set was listed on the National Register of Historic Places in 1987.

The three are the Nevada State Supreme Court Building, the Ormsby County Courthouse (of the former Ormsby County, Nevada which was dissolved in 1969), and the Heroes Memorial Building, designed by Nevada premier architect Frederick J. DeLongchamps.

References 

National Register of Historic Places in Carson City, Nevada
Neoclassical architecture in Nevada
Streamline Moderne architecture in the United States
Government buildings completed in 1920
Government buildings on the National Register of Historic Places in Nevada
Frederic Joseph DeLongchamps buildings